Hwangnam bread (named after its region of origin, Hwangnam-dong), also commonly called Gyeongju bread, is a local specialty of Gyeongju City, South Korea. It is a small pastry with a filling of red bean paste. Gyeongju bread was first baked in 1939 at a bakery in Hwangnam-dong in central Gyeongju.

It has since become popular across the country and is produced by several different companies, all based in Gyeongju. It is sold at many locations in the city, and also at specialized stores around the country.

Gyeongju bread is made from a mixture of eggs and wheat flour, with the red bean filling being almost 70% of the pastry. A chrysanthemum would be traditionally imprinted on the top. Gyeongju bread has been designated as an "outstanding regional specialty" (지역명품) by the Korean government.

Gallery

See also 

 Hangwa
 Hodu-gwaja
 Korean cuisine
 List of Korean desserts
 List of pastries

References

External links 

 English-language page of Bonga Gyeongjubread
 English-language page of Hwangnam Bakery

South Korean pastries
South Korean breads